Georgia State Route 4 Business may refer to:

 Georgia State Route 4 Business (Louisville): a business route of State Route 4 that exists entirely in Louisville
 Georgia State Route 4 Business (Swainsboro): a business route of State Route 4 that partially exists in Swainsboro
 Georgia State Route 4 Business (Wadley): a business route of State Route 4 that partially exists in Wadley
 Georgia State Route 4 Business (Waycross): a business route of State Route 4 that partially exists in Waycross

004 Business